The 1969 PGA Championship was the 51st PGA Championship, played August 14–17 on the South Course of NCR Country Club in Kettering, Ohio, a suburb south of Dayton. Raymond Floyd, age 26, won the first of his four major titles, one stroke ahead of runner-up Gary Player.

Floyd held a five-shot lead after the third round, at 202 (−11), and carded a 74 (+3) on Sunday.

During the tournament's third round, demonstrators tried to disrupt the play of Player and Jack Nicklaus. Ice was thrown in Player's face and one spectator yelled while Nicklaus prepared to putt. Security was stepped up for the final round on Sunday.

This was the first PGA Championship after the formation of the "Tournament Players Division" in December 1968, later renamed the PGA Tour. It also marked the permanent move of the PGA Championship to August, excluding 1971, which was played in Florida in February. Except for 1965, it had been played in July in the 1960s; five times during the decade it was held the week immediately after The Open Championship in Britain, including 1968. The new scheduling allowed more players to participate in both majors, cementing the concept of the modern grand slam.

The attendance on Sunday was 23,543 and a new record was set for the four days at 80,847; including practice days, the week's attendance was 106,043.

Past champions in the field

Made the cut

Missed the cut

Source:

Round summaries

First round
Thursday, August 14, 1969

Source:

Second round
Friday, August 15, 1969

Source:

Third round
Saturday, August 16, 1969

Source:

Final round
Sunday, August 17, 1969

Source:

References

External links
PGA Media Guide 2012
PGA.com – 1969 PGA Championship

PGA Championship
Golf in Ohio
Kettering, Ohio
PGA Championship
PGA Championship
PGA Championship
PGA Championship